Antonio Pucci (c. 1310–1388) was a Florentine bellfounder, town crier, self-taught as a versifier, who wrote his collection, Libro di varie storie ("Book of Various Tales"), using a popular dialect for a popular audience. In his Centiloquio he set out in  ninety-one cantos' worth of chronicle from Giovanni Villani's Cronaca. In Le proprietà di Mercato Vecchio he praised, again in terzinas, the incomparable street life of Florence's crowded market piazza. In poems he could blame or praise women with equal force, a favorite medieval trope. He composed cantari in the eight-line stanzas called ottava rima, telling the subjects of courtly romance in a fast-paced narrative, with an undertone of subversive populist skepticism that undercut the very conventions that the stories embraced, full of vivid contemporary color and pious sentiment, and perhaps he declaimed them in the public squares: La Reina d'Oriente, Gismirante, Apollonio di Tiro, Brito di Brettagna, Madonna Lionessa.

During the second half of the 14th century, Florence remained a centre of culture, but its literature developed a more popular character. The best-known representative of this development was town crier Antonio Pucci, whose vast verse production includes poems on local Florentine lore as well as historical and legendary verse narratives.

About 1373, New Chronicles from Giovanni Villani was versified and produced by fellow Florentine Antonio Pucci as a rhymed version in terza rima. The poetic transcription was called Centiloquio.

References

Bibliography 

Libro di varie storie di Antonio Pucci, edited by Alberto Varvaro, Palermo, 1957 (First modern edition).
 P. Divizia, I quindici segni del Giudizio: appunti sulla tradizione indiretta della Legenda aurea nella Firenze del Trecento, in Studi su volgarizzamenti italiani due-trecenteschi, a cura di P. Rinoldi e G. Ronchi, Roma, Viella, 2005, pp. 47–64.
E. H. Gombrich, “Giotto's Portrait of Dante?” Burlington Magazine, Vol. 121, No. 917 (Aug., 1979), pp. 471–483. (Pucci's poem on a portrait of Dante by Giotto)
 
Levin, Joan: Antonio Pucci. In: Kleinhenz, Christopher (ed.): Medieval Italy. An encyclopedia. Routledge, 2004, pp. 42–43

External links
 
 
 Brito di Brettagna e-text (in Italian)
 Madonna Lionessa e-text (in Italian)
 El Contasto de Glhuomini et Delle Donne From the Collections at the Library of Congress

14th-century Italian poets
Italian male poets
Antonio
1310 births
1388 deaths